Since 1977, Richard Neal has won 3 city council elections, 3 mayoral elections, and 18 United States House of Representatives elections.

Neal began his career in elected office after winning election in 1977 to the city council of Springfield, Massachusetts. After twice winning reelection to the city council (in 1979 and 1981), Neal was elected mayor of the city in 1983. He was twice reelected mayor, in 1985 and 1987.

In 1988, Neal was elected as a Democrat to represent Massachusetts 2nd district in the United States House of Representatives. He was subsequently reelected to this district eleven times. In 2012, he was redistricted to Massachusetts 1st district, to which he was elected. He has subsequently been reelected to this district five times, with his latest re-election occurring in 2022.

City council elections

1977

1979

1981

Mayoral elections

1983

1985

1987

Congressional elections

|-
| colspan=16 |
|-
!Year
!Winning candidate
!Party
!Pct
!Opponent
!Party
!Pct
!Opponent
!Party
!Pct
!Opponent
!Party
!Pct
!Opponent
!Party
!Pct
|-
|1988
| |Richard E. Neal
| |Democratic
| |80.23%
| |Mark Augusti
| |Peace, Jobs, Justice
| |19.75%
| colspan=2 |  Write-ins
| 0.07%
| 
| 
| 
| 
| 
| 
|-
|1990
| |Richard E. Neal
| |Democratic
| |67.97%
| colspan=2 |  Write-ins
| 32.01%
| 
| 
| 
| 
| 
| 
| 
| 
| 
|-
|1992
| |Richard E. Neal
| |Democratic
| |53.09%
| | Anthony W. Ravosa
| |Republican
| | 31.07%
| | Thomas R. Sheehan
| | For the People
| | 15.76%
| colspan=2 |  Write-ins
| 0.08%
| 
| 
| 
|-
|1994
| |Richard E. Neal
| |Democratic
| |58.52%
| | John M. Braire
| | Republican
| | 36.32%
| | Kate Ross
| | Natural Law 
| | 5.08%
| colspan=2 |  Write-ins
| 0.08%
| 
| 
| 
|-
|1996
| |Richard E. Neal
| |Democratic
| |71.67%
| | Mark Steele
| | Republican
| | 21.94%
| | Scott Andrichak
| | Independent
| | 4.04%
| | Richard Kaynor
| | Natural Law 
| | 2.25%
| colspan=2 |  Write-ins
| 0.10%
|-
|1998
| |Richard E. Neal
| |Democratic
| |98.94%
| colspan=2 |  Write-ins
| 1.06%
| 
| 
| 
| 
| 
| 
| 
| 
| 
|-
|2000
| |Richard E. Neal
| |Democratic
| |98.91%
| colspan=2 |  Write-ins
| 1.09%
| 
| 
| 
| 
| 
| 
| 
| 
| 
|-
|2002
| |Richard E. Neal
| |Democratic
| |99.13%
| colspan=2 |  Write-ins
| 0.87%
| 
| 
| 
| 
| 
| 
| 
| 
| 
|-
|2004
| |Richard E. Neal
| |Democratic
| |98.73%
| colspan=2 |  Write-ins
| 1.27%
| 
| 
| 
| 
| 
| 
| 
| 
| 
|-
|2006
| |Richard E. Neal
| |Democratic
| |99.27%
| colspan=2 |  Write-ins
| 0.73%
| 
| 
| 
| 
| 
| 
| 
| 
| 
|-
|2008
| |Richard E. Neal
| |Democratic
| |98.47%
| colspan=2 |  Write-ins
| 1.53%
| 
| 
| 
| 
| 
| 
| 
| 
| 
|-
|2010
| |Richard E. Neal
| |Democratic
| |57.32%
| |Thomas A. Wesley
| |Republican
| | 42.61%
| colspan=2 |  Write-ins
| 0.08%
| 
| 
| 
| 
| 
| 
|-
| colspan=13 |
|-
!Year
!Winning candidate
!Party
!Pct
!Opponent
!Party
!Pct
!Opponent
!Party
!Pct
!Opponent
!Party
!Pct
|-
|2012
| |Richard E. Neal
| |Democratic
| |98.42%
| colspan=2 |  Write-ins
| 1.58%
| 
| 
| 
| 
| 
| 
|-
|2014
| |Richard E. Neal
| |Democratic
| |98.45%
| colspan=2 |  Write-ins
| 1.55%
| 
| 
| 
| 
| 
| 
|-
|2016
| |Richard E. Neal
| |Democratic
| |73.34%
| |Frederick O. Mayock
| | Independent
| | 17.88%
| | Thomas T. Simmons
| |Libertarian
| | 8.56%
| colspan=2 |  Write-ins
| 0.22%
|-
|2018
| |Richard E. Neal
| |Democratic
| |97.64%
| colspan=2 |  Write-ins
| 2.36%
| 
| 
| 
| 
| 
| 
|-
|2020
| |Richard E. Neal
| |Democratic
| |96.51%
| Alex Morse
| Write-in
| 0.45%
| colspan=2 |  Other write-ins
| 3.04%
|
|
|
|-
|2022
| |Richard E. Neal
| |Democratic
| |
| |Richard Martilli
| |Republican
| | 
| 
| 
|
|
|
|

1988

1990

1992

1994

1996

1998

2000

2002

2004

2006

2008

2010

2012

2014

2016

2018

2020

2022

References

Neal, Richard